Lin Yaw-shing (born 17 October 1959) is a Taiwanese physician and politician.

Lin graduated from Taichung First Senior High School, then attended Taipei Medical University before earning a doctorate from Shiga University of Medical Science in Japan. He taught as an associate professor at China Medical College. Lin was elected to the Legislative Yuan as a member of the Kuomintang for the first time in 1995. He claimed 12.36% of the vote share in Taichung County, winning the most votes of any candidate in the multi-member constituency. Lin was reelected in 1998, although his vote share fell to 7.82%. Lin ran unsuccessfully for a third term in 2001, as his vote share was reduced to 4.51%. In 2008, Tsai Huang-liang accused Lin of accepting NT$3.5 million from the Taiwan Dental Association, after Tsai had already been implicated in the same case.

References

1959 births
Living people
20th-century Taiwanese physicians
Members of the 3rd Legislative Yuan
Members of the 4th Legislative Yuan
Kuomintang Members of the Legislative Yuan in Taiwan
Taichung Members of the Legislative Yuan
Taipei Medical University alumni
Taiwanese expatriates in Japan